Pamela Hathway, (born 25 October 1987 in Munich) is a professional squash player who represents Germany. She reached a career-high world ranking of World No. 138 in March 2009.

References

External links 

1987 births
Living people
German female squash players